William Fajardo (15 October 1929 – 14 June 2002) was a Mexican épée, foil and sabre fencer. He competed at the 1960 and 1968 Summer Olympics. Between 1954 and 1962, he won four bronze medals and a silver at the Central American and Caribbean Games.

References

External links
 

1929 births
2002 deaths
Mexican male épée fencers
Olympic fencers of Mexico
Fencers at the 1960 Summer Olympics
Fencers at the 1968 Summer Olympics
People from Mérida, Yucatán
Sportspeople from Yucatán (state)
Mexican male foil fencers
Mexican male sabre fencers
20th-century Mexican people